Sylvester is a locality in northern Alberta, Canada within the County of Grande Prairie No. 1.

It took its name from nearby Sylvester Creek, which in turn was named after Sylvester Belcourt, an Iroquois Cree Metis fur trapper who had settled in the area. The post office also contained a store. The first postmaster was T.R. Elliot. Across from Elliott's store and post office was Itipaw School, a one-room log school which had been built in 1934. The post office closed in 1951, and the school in 1952. Information on Sylvester locality and the people who lived there can be found in Beaverlodge to the Rockies.

References 

Localities in the County of Grande Prairie No. 1